The following is a list of the annual point scoring champions of the top Russian ice hockey league of each era, from the Soviet Championship League to the current Kontinental Hockey League.

Soviet Championship

1965-66 Anatoli Firsov -- CSKA Moscow
1966-67 Victor Polupanov -- CSKA Moscow
1967-68 Vyacheslav Starshinov -- Spartak Moscow
1968-69 Alexander Yakushev -- Spartak Moscow
1969-70 Vladimir Petrov -- CSKA Moscow
1970-71 Alexander Maltsev -- Dynamo Moscow
1971-72 Valeri Kharlamov -- CSKA Moscow
1972-73 Vladimir Petrov -- CSKA Moscow
1973-74 Vyacheslav Anisin -- Krylya Sovetov
1974-75 Vladimir Petrov -- CSKA Moscow
1975-76 Viktor Shalimov -- Spartak Moscow
1976-77 Helmuts Balderis -- Dinamo Riga
1977-78 Vladimir Petrov -- CSKA Moscow
1978-79 Vladimir Petrov -- CSKA Moscow
1979-80 Sergei Makarov -- CSKA Moscow
1980-81 Sergei Makarov -- CSKA Moscow
1981-82 Sergei Makarov -- CSKA Moscow
1982-83 Helmuts Balderis -- Dinamo Riga
1983-84 Sergei Makarov -- CSKA Moscow
1984-85 Sergei Makarov -- CSKA Moscow
1985-86 Sergei Makarov -- CSKA Moscow
1986-87 Sergei Makarov -- CSKA Moscow
1987-88 Sergei Makarov - CSKA Moscow
1988-89 Sergei Makarov -- CSKA Moscow
1989-90 Dmitri Kvartalnov -- Khimik Voskresensk
1990-91 Ramil Yuldashev -- Sokil Kiev

CIS Championship

1991-92 Roman Oksiuta -- Khimik Voskresensk

International Hockey League

1992-93 Alexei Tkachuk -- Spartak Moscow
1993-94 Dmitri Denisov -- Salavat Yulaev Ufa
1994-95 Dmitri Denisov -- Salavat Yulaev Ufa
1995-96 Alexander Korolyuk -- Krylya Sovetov

Russian Superleague

1996-97 Nikolai Borschevsky -- Spartak Moscow
1997-98 Andrei Tarasenko -- Lada Togliatti
1998-99 Yevgeni Koreshkov -- Metallurg Magnitogorsk
1999-2000 Georgy Yevtyukhin -- Metallurg Novokuznetsk
2000-01 Andrei Razin -- Metallurg Magnitogorsk
2001-02 Maxim Sushinsky -- Avangard Omsk
2002-03 Tomáš Vlasák -- Avangard Omsk; Pavel Patera -- Avangard Omsk
2003-04 Maxim Sushinsky -- Avangard Omsk
2004-05 Maxim Sushinsky -- Avangard Omsk
2005-06 Sergei Mozyakin -- CSKA Moscow
2006-07 Alexei Morozov -- Ak Bars Kazan
2007-08 Sergei Mozyakin -- Atlant Moscow Oblast

Kontinental Hockey League

2008–09 Sergei Mozyakin -- Atlant Moscow Oblast
2009–10 Sergei Mozyakin -- Atlant Moscow Oblast
2010–11 Alexander Radulov -- Salavat Yulaev Ufa
2011–12 Alexander Radulov -- Salavat Yulaev Ufa
2012–13 Sergei Mozyakin -- Metallurg Magnitogorsk
2013–14 Sergei Mozyakin -- Metallurg Magnitogorsk
2014–15 Alexander Radulov -- CSKA Moscow
2015–16 Sergei Mozyakin -- Metallurg Magnitogorsk
2016–17 Sergei Mozyakin -- Metallurg Magnitogorsk
2017–18 Ilya Kovalchuk -- SKA Saint Petersburg
2018–19 Nikita Gusev -- SKA Saint Petersburg
2019–20 Vadim Shipachyov -- Dynamo Moscow
2020–21 Vadim Shipachyov -- Dynamo Moscow

See also
List of Soviet and Russian ice hockey champions
List of Soviet and Russian ice hockey goal scoring champions
Soviet MVP (hockey)

Sources
Internet Hockey Database
CCCP Hockey International
A to Z Encyclopedia of Ice Hockey

Scoring champions
Kontinental Hockey League
Scoring champions
International Hockey League (1992–1996)
Scoring champions
Ice hockey statistics
Scoring champions